Robert Lee Jones III (born September 25, 1977) is an American actor. He is best known for his role as Quentin Fields in One Tree Hill. In 2009, Jones starred in the film Hurricane Season with Forest Whitaker. In 2010, he starred in the series Hellcats. He appeared in Temptation: Confessions of a Marriage Counselor alongside Jurnee Smollett-Bell and Lance Gross.

Jones attended the University of California, Berkeley and also played on the California Golden Bears men's basketball team from 1996 to 2000.

Filmography

References

External links 
 

Living people
1977 births
21st-century American male actors
Male actors from California
American male film actors
American male television actors
California Golden Bears men's basketball players
People from Rancho Cordova, California
University of California, Berkeley alumni
African-American male actors
American men's basketball players
21st-century African-American people
20th-century African-American people